Kasam Tere Pyaar Ki is an Indian Hindi language television romantic drama series that premiered on 7 March 2016 on Colors TV. It is also digitally available on Voot. Produced by Ekta Kapoor under Balaji Telefilms, it stars Kratika Sengar and Sharad Malhotra. It went off air on 27 July 2018.

It traces the journey of two lovers, Rishi and Tanu, in a saga of lovers reuniting after rebirths.

Plot

Tanusree "Tanu" Khurana and Rishi Singh Bedi are friends like their fathers in Patiala. Katyani Bai prophecies they will be together for next 7 births. Rano who dislikes Tanu, tricks Raj into going to America. Tanu and Rishi part ways but vow to unite.

17 years later

Tanu desperately waits for Rishi, who returns to India. Veerendra and Sharda die in a terrorist attack. Bani sends Tanu and Ahana to Mumbai and misleads Bedi's that Neha is Tanu, and Tanvi as real one's name. Rishi gets engaged to Neha, but falls in love with Tanvi who is set to wed Pawan, an already married man who wants to use her as surrogate—a truth which later comes out. Tanvi reveals she is Tanu and marries Rishi. Neha lies to Sandy that he molested her so Sandy tries to kill Rishi. He shoots him but mistakenly kills Tanu. Rishi is shattered by Tanu's death. On the other hand Sandy's sister-in-law gives birth a baby girl named Tanuja.

20 years later

Tanu has reincarnated as Tanuja and lives in Amritsar with Sandy. On the other hand Rishi has lost his faith in love. Ahana and Manpreet are married and they've two children Smiley and Chintu. Neha and Sandy also have two daughters name Vidhi and Nidhi. By Neha and Bani's trick Tanuja comes to Mumbai and she feels connected with the city. Tanuja's past life started to haunt her. After coming to Mumbai, she starts to find a job and she gets a job in Rishi's company. Tanuja becomes his secretary. Rishi starts to hate her unknowingly she is his secretary. Bani sends Tanuja, Vidhi and Nidhi to the Bedi house. Rishi meets with Tanuja.On the Ganesh Puja, fire breaks out badly burning

3 months later

Tanuja gets Tanu's face, whose photo mistakenly was given by Priti to the doctor. Rishi decides to remarry Malaika to move on, but Raj learns her truth and makes Tanuja marry him. They slowly get close and realize their love for each other. Katyani tells Tanuja that she is a bad omen for Rishi. As Tanuja demands divorce, Rishi gets engaged to Netra to make her jealous. Tanuja finds out that Katyani lied to her and confesses her love to Rishi.

7 years later

Tanuja lives with Natasha and Abhishek in London, who pretends to be her husband, and they reach India. Rishi and Netra also pose to be married. He and Abhishek become business partners. Rishi meets Natasha, unaware she is his child, who enrolls in Tanya's school. When Rishi comes across Tanuja, he is disheartened believing she is Abhishek's wife and they've a daughter.

Rishi learns he is Natasha's real father, and confronts Tanuja who refuses to return. Abhishek who now loves her discovers their past. Rishi finds out Tanuja didn't marry Abhishek. Upon learning he didn't marry Netra, Tanuja unites with him. Heartbroken, Netra arranges a trap to kill them. Abhishek finds out but is late to inform Tanuja. Netra is jailed. Tanuja dies. Depressed, Rishi commits suicide.

25 years later

Rishi and Tanuja take rebirth as Ranbir Kapoor, a famous footballer in Canada, and Kritika Kohli, who lives in Ludhiana. Believing Arun died, Malini is shocked after seeing him in news and enters Mumbai with Kritika to meet him. Ranbir arrives there for a football match. Malini dies due to injuries from fire. To fulfill her last wish Kritika finally meets Arun who introduces her as his niece. She comes across Ranbir, who falls for her; they become friends.

In the end, Ranbir professes his love for Kritika who recalls their previous lives. They recognise and hug each other and unite.

Cast

Main
 Sharad Malhotra as 
 Rishi Singh Bedi – Raj and Rano's second son.Manpreet and Yuvraj brother.Neha , Malaika and Netra's ex-fiance. Tanu and Tanuja's husband.Natashas's biological and Tanya's adoptive father.(2016–18) (Dead)
 Hardik Khanna as Child Rishi Singh Bedi. (2016)
 Ranbir Kapoor –Balraj and Mahima's son; Akki's cousin and best friend. Kritika's love interest.Rishi's reincarnation.
 Kratika Sengar as 
 Tanushree "Tanu" Singh Bedi (née Khurana) – Virendra and Sharda's elder daughter; Ahana's sister; Rishi's first wife. (2016) (Dead)
 Kreesha Shah as Child Tanusree Khurana (2016)
 Tanuja Singh Bedi (née Sikand) - Vikram's daughter.Sandy and Neha's niece.Abhishek's ex-fiance.Rishi's second wife . Natasha's biological and Tanya's adoptive mother . Tanusree's reincarnation. (2016–2018) (Dead) 
Shivani Tomar as Tanuja Sikand (Before plastic surgery) (2016)
 Kritika Kohli –  Arun and Malini's daughter; Pammie's step-daughter; Ishani and Jiyana's half-sister; Ranbir's love interest. Tanuja's reincarnation.(2018)

Recurring
Saba Mirza as Preeti "Beeji" Singh Bedi – Dhanraj's wife; Raj's mother; Rishi, Manpreet and Purab's grandmother; Yuvraj's adoptive grandmother. Nakul, Smiley, Chintu and Natasha's great-grandmother; Tanya's great-great-grandmother (2016–18)
 Vijay Kashyap as Raj Singh Bedi – Dhanraj and Preeti son; Rano husband; Rishi, Manpreet and Purab's father; Yuvraj's adoptive father; Nakul, Smiley, Chintu and Natasha's grandfather; Tanya's great-grandfather. (2016–18)
 Vibha Chibber as Rano Singh Bedi – Raj wife; Rishi and Manpreet's mother; Yuvraj's adoptive mother. Nakul, Smiley, Chintu and Natasha's grandmother; Tanya's great-grandmother. (2016–18)
 Lalit Bisht as Yuvraj Singh Bedi – Raj and Rano's eldest son-elder brother of Rishi and Manpreet.Divya's husband; Nakul's father (2016–17)
 Chetna Kaintura as Divya Singh Bedi – Yuvraj wife; Nakul mother (2016–17)
 Zuber K. Khan as Manpreet Singh Bedi – Raj and Rano's youngest son-younger brother of Yuvraj and Rishi. Ahana's husband; Smiley and Chintu's father; Tanya's grandfather. (2016–18)
 Aditi Sharma Ved as Ahana Singh Bedi (née Khurana) – Virendra and Sharda younger daughter; Tanushree's younger sister; Manpreet's wife; Smiley and Chintu's  mother; Tanya's grandmother. (2016–18)
 Manorama Bhattishyam as Katyanibai – A Kali maa devotee who told that Rishi and Tanushree will be together forever. (2016–17)
 Nikhil Khurana / Pranav Misshra / Pratyaksha Rajbhatt as Nakul Singh Bedi – Yuvraj and Divya's son (2016–17)
 Farhad Khan / Chandni Sandhu as Smiley Singh Bedi – Manpreet and Ahana's daughter; Chintu sister; Rohit's fiancée. Tanya's biological mother. (2016–17)
 Devarsh Nirmal as Chintu Singh Bedi – Manpreet and Ahana son. Smiley's brother. (2016)
 Vishnu Sharma as Virendra Khurana – Kuljeet's brother; Sharda's husband; Tanushree and Ahana's father (2016) (Dead)
 Jyoti Gauba as Sharda Khurana – Virendra wife; Tanushree and Ahana's mother. (2016) (Dead)
 Roma Bali as Bani Khurana – Kuljeet wife; Neha and Swati mother (2016–17)
 Gagan Gupta as Kuljeet Khurana – Virendra's brother; Bani's husband; Neha and Swati's father.(2016)
 Renee Dhyani as Neha Sikand (née Khurana) – Kuljeet and Bani's elder daughter; Swati's sister; Sandeep wife; Vidhi and Nidhi mother. (2016–17)
 Arun Singh Rana / Sharhaan Singh as Sandeep "Sandy" Sikand – Tanu's killer.Neha husband; Vidhi and Nidhi's father. (2016)
 Suman Jain as Swati Khurrana – Kuljeet and Bani's younger daughter; Neha's sister  (2016)
 Hema Sood as Nidhi Sikand – Neha and Sandeep's daughter. Vidhi's sister. (2016)
 Shreya Gupta as Vidhi Sikand – Neha and Sandeep's daughter. Nidhi's sister. (2016–17)
 Malhar Pandya as Pawan Malhotra – Savitri and Shrikant's son; Saloni's husband. Tanu's former fiancé.(2016)
 Sehrish Ali as Saloni Malhotra – Pawan wife(2016)
 Parveen Kaur as Savitri Malhotra – Shrikant's wife; Pawan's mother (2016)
 Smriti Khanna as Malaika Malhotra – Rishi, Shekhar and Purab ex-fiancée. (2016–17)
 Rohit Sharma as Shekhar Singh Ahlawat – Malaika's boyfriend (2016–17)
 Abhilash Kumar as Rohit Luthra – Smiley's fiancé; Tanya's father.(2016–17)
 Pranitaa Pandit as Netra Mehta – Chanchal daughter. Rish former fiancé; Tanya's caretaker. Rishi and Tanuja's murderer. (2017–18)
 Amit Tandon as Abhishek Khurana – A rich business man.Tanuja's friend. (2017–18)
 Shivika Singh as Natasha Singh Bedi – Rishi and Tanuja's daughter.Tanya's aunt and adoptive sister.(2017–18)
 Chahat Tewani as Tanya Luthra –Rohit and Smiley's biological daughter.  Rishi and Tanuja's adoptive daughter. Natasha's niece and adoptive sister.
(2017–18)
 Puneet Sachdeva as Purab Singh Bedi – Raj and Rita's son; Rishi and Manpreet's half-brother; Swati's husband.(2017)
 Shraddha Arya as Swati Singh Bedi – Purab's wife (cameo) (2017)
 Aishwarya Raj Bhakuni as Riya Jakhar (cameo) (2017)
 Sonali Joshi as Abhishek's aunt. Mayra mother
 Rini Das as Myra Khurana Abhishek's cousin.
 Aansh Arora as Samar Singh Rajput.Abhishek friend.(2017)
 Mayank Kumar as Rohit Rajvansh Abhishek friend and manager in London.(2017–2018)
 Rajesh Puri as Arun Kohli – Malini's widower; Parminder's husband; Kritika, Ishani, Jiyana father (2018)
 Jyothi Joshi as Malini Kohli – Arun first wife; Kritika mother.(2018) (Dead)
 Shivani Gosain as Parminder "Pammi" Kohli – Arun second wife; Ishani and Jiyana mother; Kritika step-mother (2018)
 Vedika Bhandari as Ishaani Kohli – Parmimder and Arun's elder daughter; Jiyana's sister; Kritika's half-sister.(2018)
 Sabina Jat as Jiyana Kohli – Parmimder and Arun's younger daughter. Ishani's sister; Kritika's half-sister; Akshay's love interest. (2018)
 Karan Godhwani as Akshay "Akki" Kapoor – Ranbir's cousin and best friend; Jiyana love interest.(2018)
 Bikramjeet Kanwarpal as Balraj Kapoor - Mahima's husband; Ranbir's father.(2018)
 Manjushree Kulkarni as Mahima Kapoor - Balraj's wife; Ranbir's mother.(2018)
 Shamin Mannan as Malishka Batra - Aayush daughter (2018)
 Amit Behl as Aayush Batra - Malishka father (2018)
 Jiten Lalwani as Advocate Vikaas Sharma (2018)
 Pooja Singh as Shilpa - Malishka's cousin

Awards and nominations

References

External links
 Official Website
 

Balaji Telefilms television series
2016 Indian television series debuts
Indian drama television series
Colors TV original programming
Hindi-language television shows
Television shows set in Pune
2018 Indian television series endings